Poland has participated in the Eurovision Young Dancers 11 times since its debut in 1993. Poland has hosted the contest a record three times, in 1997, 2005 and 2013, and has won the contest three times. On 5 September 2016, Polish broadcaster Telewizja Polska (TVP) confirmed they would participate again in 2017.

Participation overview

Hostings

See also
Poland in the Eurovision Song Contest
Poland in the Eurovision Dance Contest
Poland in the Junior Eurovision Song Contest
Poland in the Eurovision Young Musicians

References

External links 
 Eurovision Young Dancers

Countries in the Eurovision Young Dancers